The U.S. state of Maine first required its residents to register their motor vehicles and display license plates in 1905. , plates are issued by the Maine Bureau of Motor Vehicles, within the office of the Department of the Secretary of State. Front and rear plates are required for most classes of vehicles, while only rear plates are required for motorcycles and trailers.

Maine legislators effectively removed a potentially unconstitutional review process for vanity plates in 2015, which formerly was able to reject plates that were "obscene, contemptuous, profane or prejudicial." Due to a proliferation of vulgar plates over the following years, the legislature directed the Bureau of Motor Vehicles to establish new rules for reviewing plates in 2021. The new rules ban profane or obscene language, language inciting violence, and derogatory references "to age, race, ethnicity, sexual orientation, gender identity, national origin, religion or disability." A committee for vanity plates consults the online Urban Dictionary for assistance with "arcane lingo".

Passenger baseplates

1905 to 1949

1950 to present
The 1955 (dated 1956) issue was the first Maine license plate that complied with these standards.

Optional plates
All optional plates introduced from 2003 onwards use a 123-ABC serial format, with blocks of three-letter series assigned for each plate as required.

Non-passenger plates

References

External links
Maine license plates, 1969–present

Maine
Transportation in Maine
Maine transportation-related lists